Four ships of the British Royal Navy have been named HMS Glatton.

 The first  was a 56-gun fourth rate, originally an East Indiaman purchased in 1795 and converted. Participated in the 1797 Battle of Camperdown, and the 1801 Battle of Copenhagen.  Converted to a water depot in 1814 and sunk as a breakwater in 1830.  
 The second  was an  launched in 1855 and broken up in 1864.
 The third  was a turret ship launched in 1871 and sold 1903.
 The fourth  was a coast defence ship, originally the Norwegian Bjørgvin, purchased in 1915 and accidentally blown up in September 1918.

References

Royal Navy ship names